Charles Chukwuma Soludo  (born 28 July 1960) is a Nigerian politician, banker, and economics professor who has served as governor of Anambra State since March 2022. He is a former governor and chairman of the board of directors of the Central Bank of Nigeria. He was appointed as the bank's governor on 29 May 2004. 

Soludo is a member of the British Department for International Development's International Advisory Group as well as a member of President Buhari's Presidential Economic Advisory Committee.

Career

Academia
Soludo has been a visiting scholar at the International Monetary Fund, the University of Cambridge, the Brookings Institution, the University of Warwick, and the University of Oxford as well as a visiting professor at Swarthmore College (USA). He has also worked as a consultant for a number of international organisations, including The World Bank, the United Nations Economic Commission for Africa, and the United Nations Development Programme.
Soludo is a core professional in the business of macroeconomics. He obtained his three degrees and then professorship at the University of Nigeria in Nsukka, Enugu State.  Soludo graduated with a First Class Honours degree in 1984, an MSc Economics in 1987, and a PhD in 1989, winning prizes for the best student at all three levels.

Chukwuma has been trained and involved in research, teaching, and auditing in such disciplines as multi-country macro-econometric modelling, techniques of computable general equilibrium modelling, survey methodology, and panel data econometrics, among others. He studied and taught these courses at many universities, including Oxford, Cambridge, and Warwick. Soludo has co-authored, co-edited, and authored a number of books on this subject matter.

In 1998, Soludo was appointed to the position of professor of economics at the University of Nigeria; the next year he became a visiting professor at Swarthmore College in Swarthmore, Pennsylvania, USA.

Government
Soludo joined the federal government in 2003 and served as chief economic adviser to President Olusegun Obasanjo. Prior to his May 2004 appointment to the CBN's chairmanship, he was the Chief Executive of the National Planning Commission of Nigeria.
In January 2008, in a speech to the Nigerian Economic Society, he predicted consolidation in the private banking industry, saying "By the end of 2008, there will be fewer banks than there are today.
The restructuring of the banking industry has been attracting funds from local and foreign investors, which have increased banks' ability to lend to customers". Soludo hopes to see Nigeria become Africa's financial hub, and considers microfinance important to the federal government's economic policies.

Appointment as a member of the Economic Advisory Council (EAC)
On 16 September 2019, the President of Nigeria, Muhammadu Buhari, appointed Soludo as a member of a newly formed 8-member Economic Advisory Council (EAC) which would report directly to the President on issues related to national economic policies.

Politics
In September 2009, Soludo announced his aspiration for the seat of the Governor of Anambra State, in the south-eastern Nigerian state's election of 9 February 2010. On 9 October 2009, the People's Democratic Party (PDP) chose Soludo as their consensus candidate for the position from a field of 47 candidates, after repeated attempts to hold elective primaries were stalled by court injunctions. However, his nomination was contested by 23 of the 47 aspirants, citing lack of transparency in the process.

After this initial rancour, 36 out of the 47 candidates, and several top shots of the PDP affirmed their support for Soludo on Wednesday, 14 October 2009. Soludo went on to lose to Peter Obi in an election which was largely considered free and fair according to major election observers. However, with his perceived solid performance as CBN governor, Soludo remains a respected economic policy authority in Nigeria. Political commentators, while urging an issue-based campaign in the 2011 election, had called on aspirants to work with respected economists like Soludo towards an acceptable economic plan.

On 17 July 2013, Soludo resigned from the People's Democratic Party  after writing a letter to the National Chairman of the party, Alhaji Bamanga Tukur. He later joined the All Progressives Grand Alliance in preparation for the November 2013 governorship race in Anambra state. In mid-August 2013, he, along with five other qualified aspirants, were disqualified by the APGA Screening Committee.

On 31 March 2021, unidentified gunmen disrupted an interactive session between Isuofia youths and Soludo at the town's civic centre, leading to the death of three police officers.

In February 2021, Soludo officially declared his intention to run for the position of Governor of Anambra State under the banner of APGA.

On 9 November 2021, the Independent National Electoral Commission announced Soludo as the winner of the 2021 Anambra State gubernatorial election and governor-elect of Anambra State. He was issued a certificate of return on 13 November 2021.

On 17 March 2022, Soludo was sworn in as the fifth Governor of Anambra State. During the inaugural event, a fight broke out between the wife of former Governor of Anambra State Willie Obiano, Ebele Obiano, and the wife of Chukwuemeka Odumegwu Ojukwu, Bianca Odumegwu-Ojukwu.

Personal life
Soludo has been married to Nonye Frances Soludo since December 1992, and they have six children.

Publications

1992
 "North-South Macroeconomic Interactions: Comparative Analysis using the MULTIMOD and INTERMOD global models", Charles Chukwuma Soludo, Brookings discussion papers in international economics, Brookings Institution (1992)

1993
 "Implications of alternative macroeconomic policy responses to external shocks in Africa", Charles Chukwuma Soludo,  Development research papers series, United Nations Economic Commission for Africa, Socio-Economic Research and Planning Division (1993)

 "Growth performance in Africa: Further evidence on the external shocks versus domestic policy debate", Charles Chukwuma Soludo, Development research papers series, United Nations Economic Commission for Africa, Socio-Economic Research and Planning Division (1993)

1994
 "The Consequences of US Fiscal Actions in a Global Model with Alternative Assumptions about the Exchange Regime in Developing Countries”, Ralph C. Bryan and Charles Chukwuma Soludo. Chapter 13 in David Currie and David Vines, eds., North-South Linkages and International Macroeconomic Policy, Cambridge: Cambridge University Press for the Centre for Economic Policy Research. (Brookings Discussion Paper in International Economics No. 103. Washington, DC: Brookings Institution, February 1994.)
1995
 "Macroeconomic adjustment, trade, and growth: Policy analysis using a macroeconomic model of Nigeria", Charles Chukwuma Soludo, AERC research paper, African Economic Research Consortium (1995)  

1998
 

1999
 "Our Continent, Our Future: African Perspectives on Structural Adjustment", T. Mkandawire and C.C. Soludo, Council for the Development of Social Science Research in Africa, Dakar, 1999, in Journal of Sustainable Development in Africa, 1:2, 1999.

2002
 "African Voices on Structural Adjustment: A Companion to Our Continent, Our Future", Edited by Thandika Mkandawire and Charles C. Soludo. At least three editions: IDRC/CODESRIA/Africa World Press 2002, 280 pp.; Paperback,  Jan 2003; Africa World Press 2003, 

 

2004
 "The Politics of Trade and Industrial Policy in Africa: Forced Consensus", Edited by Charles Chukwuma Soludo, Michael Osita Ogbu and Ha-Joon Chang, Africa World Press (January 2004),  (Also International Development Research Centre)

2006
 "Potential Impacts of the New Global Financial Architecture on Poor Countries", Edited by Charles Soludo, Musunuru Rao, 80 pages, 2006, CODESRIA, Senegal, Paperback

Notable articles
 Economic and Institutional Restructuring for the Next Nigeria
 COVID-19: Can Africa Afford Lockdowns?

419 scams
Soludo's name and position are frequently used by con artists in their attempts to add credibility to their advance-fee fraud activities (also known as 419 scams).

References

External links
 Publications on Google Scholar

Living people
1960 births
Nigerian bankers
Central bankers
Nigerian economists
People from Anambra State
University of Nigeria alumni
Governors of the Central Bank of Nigeria
Governors of Anambra State